The Influence of a Book is a novel by the Canadian writer Phillipe-Ignace François Aubert du Gaspé, first published in 1837. It is considered to be the first French Canadian novel, and although the book was not well received initially, it has come to be recognized as a major landmark in Canadian literature.

It is the tale of Charles Amand's quest for gold. Between alchemy, the courtship of his daughter Amélie, the legend of Rose Latulipe and the murder of the peddler Guilmette, there is a satirical theme aimed at spiritual poverty in Quebec.

The Influence of a Book, an English language translation by Claire Rothman, was published in 1993 and won the John Glassco Translation Prize in 1994.

Editions
 Le Chercheur de trésors. (1864) by H. R. Casgrain
 L'influence d'un livre.  (1968) by Léopold Leblanc
 Le chercheur de trésors ou L’influence d’un livre. roman. 1837 online
 Transl. Claire Holden Rothman: The Influence of a Book. Robert Davies Publ. 1993  John Glassco Translation Award

References

External links
 

1837 novels
Canadian French-language novels
Novels set in Quebec